Pnyxia is a genus of dark-winged fungus gnats, insects in the family Sciaridae. There are at least four described species in Pnyxia.

Species
These four species belong to the genus Pnyxia:
 Pnyxia scabiei (Hopkins, 1895) i c g b (potato scab gnat)
 Pnyxia schmallenbergensis Menzel & Mohrig, 1998 g
 Pnyxia schmallerbergensis Menzel & Mohrig, 1998 c g
 Pnyxia thaleri (Mohrig & Mamaev, 1978) c g
Data sources: i = ITIS, c = Catalogue of Life, g = GBIF, b = Bugguide.net

References

Further reading

 
 

Sciaridae
Articles created by Qbugbot
Sciaroidea genera